The South Carolina Public Service Commission (PSC) is a regulatory agency that regulates public utilities in the state of South Carolina, including electric power, telecommunications, natural gas, and  water & wastewater. In addition, the PSC regulates common carriers, including motor carriers of household goods and taxicabs. The PSC also oversees hazardous waste disposal. The headquarters of the PSC is in the state's capital, Columbia.

References

External links
 

South Carolina
State agencies of South Carolina